"I Don't Like It, I Love It" is a song by American rapper Flo Rida from his 2015 EP My House. The song features American singer Robin Thicke and Earth, Wind & Fire bassist Verdine White. It was released as the album's third promotional single on March 31, 2015. The song was released as the album's second official single on June 19, 2015, in the Republic of Ireland and on June 21 in the United Kingdom. In the latter country, BBC Radio 1's Nick Grimshaw began playing an unofficial version of the song in which soundbites by Audrey Roberts (portrayed by Sue Nicholls) from the long-running British soap opera Coronation Street were played over it..The song was heard in the climax of the 2014 comedy film Ride Along 2

Music video
The music video features Flo Rida and Robin Thicke but not Verdine White. The video, directed by Director X, is set on row of brownstones in Jersey City during a block party on a Summer day. In the video, Flo Rida and Thicke casually flirt with women passing by; ice cream is distributed to the neighborhood and children play in the spraying water of an open fire hydrant. The video ends with Flo-Rida, Thicke and party-goers dancing together in the street into the night.

Track listing
Digital download
"I Don't Like It, I Love It"  – 3:43
"I Don't Like It, I Love It"  – 3:13
"I Don't Like It, I Love It"  – 3:20
"I Don't Like It, I Love It"  – 3:46
"I Don't Like It, I Love It"  – 3:22
"I Don't Like It, I Love It"  – 3:34
"I Don't Like It, I Love It"  – 3:41
"I Don't Like It, I Love It"  – 4:24
"I Don't Like It, I Love It"  – 2:37

Charts

Weekly charts

Year-end charts

Certifications

Release history

References

2015 singles
2014 songs
Atlantic Records singles
Flo Rida songs
Songs written by Flo Rida
Songs written by Thomas Troelsen
Songs written by Eskeerdo
Songs written by Breyan Isaac
Music videos directed by Director X
Songs written by Sermstyle